Indirect presidential elections were held in Latvia on 29 May 2019.

Voting system
Before the first round of the presidential election, the political parties represented in the Saeima nominate their candidate.

The president is elected in the first round if he receives the absolute majority of the deputies, i.e. 51 votes out of 100.

In case of failure, another round is organized with the same candidates or different ones, and under the same conditions. If no one is elected, others rounds are held until a candidate receives 51 votes and becomes President of Latvia. The president of the Saeima chairs the electoral college.

Elections

Latvia's parliament elected former European Court of Justice judge Egils Levits as the Baltic country's next president on Wednesday, a largely ceremonial role that also brings with it limited political powers.

The results of the vote were as follows:

Having received 61 votes, Levits began serving a four-year term starting on July 8, when incumbent president Raimonds Vējonis' term came to an end.

References

Latvia
Presidential election
May 2019 events in Europe
Presidential elections in Latvia